The University of the Arts Bremen (German: Hochschule für Künste Bremen, HfK Bremen) is a public university in Bremen, Germany. It is one of the most successful arts institutions, and its origins date back to 1873. The University of the Arts Bremen runs a Faculty of Fine Arts and Design, and a Faculty of Music, with approximately 900 students, 65 professors and about 180 assistant professors.

The academic subdivisions within the University are Music, Art, Design and practical theory. The institution's specialisms in both music and visual arts is unique within Germany, save for the Berlin University of the Arts. Recent works and exhibitions combine visual art, digital media and music, with emphasis on co-operation between disciplines.

History
In 1998, the institution celebrated the tenth anniversary of the University of the Arts and the 125th anniversary of the Art Academy.

Since 2003, the Fine Arts Faculty of the University of the Arts Bremen has been located at Speicher XI, in the former overseas harbour in the Überseestadt district. The Music Faculty is located at a second site on the Dechanatstraße in the city centre, close to the Rathaus and the Cathedral.

Courses of studies
The following study programs are offered by the university:

Department of Fine Art and Design
Fine art, Diplom, classes
sculpture
film
photography
graphic design
ceramics
concept
painting
new media
drawing
Design, Diplom, focus
information design
product design
fashion design
Digital media, Bachelor/Master
media studies

Department of Music
 Diplom and postgraduate studies in singing, early music, musical composition, music education, church music and training for music teachers.
 Advanced and further training courses for highly talented students from regular schools
 International EuropaChorAkademie, founded by Joshard Daus in 1997, in collaboration with the University of Mainz.

Alumni 
 see also: :Category:University of the Arts Bremen alumni
 Esther Haase, photographer
 Dorothee Mields, soprano
 Nils Mönkemeyer, violist
 Barbara Stühlmeyer, writer, musicologist
 Ludger Stühlmeyer, cantor, composer, musicologist
 Erich Witte, stage actor, operatic tenor and opera director
 Boris Cepeda, pianist, conductor, diplomat

Academic staff 

 Klaus Bernbacher, German conductor, music event manager, broadcasting manager
 Hans Davidsson, Swedish organist and organ teacher
 Angelo Evelyn, Canadian artist
 Hans-Joachim Frey, theatre director, theatre manager and cultural manager
 Rudolf Kelber, organist, harpsichordist, conductor and church musician
 Maximilian Marcoll, composer and performer 
 Thomas Mohr (tenor), tenor and academic teacher
 Hille Perl, viola da gamba player and teacher
 Stephen Stubbs, American lutenist and music director in the early music scene

Literature
 Hesse, Hans: Bis zur Narbe. Eine Erzählung. Bremen 2011. Ed. by the University of the Arts Bremen. .

See also 
 Klaus Kuhnke Archive for Popular Music

References

External links
 
Website "Bis zur Narbe"
Online portal ARTIST for Applications 

 
Education in Bremen
Bremen
Bremen
1873 establishments in Germany
Universities and colleges in Bremen (state)
Art schools in Germany
Universities of Applied Sciences in Germany